Giovanni II Ventimiglia y Moncada, 6th Marquis of Geraci (died 1533) was a Sicilian aristocrat, a member of the prominent House of Venitmiglia.

Giovanni II Ventimiglia y Moncada, was the son of Simone I Ventimiglia, 5th Marquis of Geraci, (1485–1544).  Giovanni II was confirmed as the 6th Marquis in 1545. His grandson, Giovanni III (1559–1619) and former Viceroys of Sicily, is sometimes erroneously as Giovanni II. Giovanni III also served as President of Sicily Kingdom, 1595, 1598 and 1608.

In 1527 Giovanni married Isabella Moncada y La Grua, niece of the former Spanish  Viceroy of Sicily and Naples, and daughter of Hugo's brother, Juan de Moncada y de Tolça, 3rd Count of Marmilia and 1st Count of Aitona.

Origins of the title Marquis of Geraci
In 1436, the first title of Marquis of Geraci was awarded to the 7th Count of Geraci, Giovanni I Ventimiglia, 1st Marquis of Geraci (1383–1475), by the Aragonese Crown, ruling in Sicily since the Sicilian Vespers in 1282. This Giovanni I was also lord of Castelbuono, Tusa, Gangi, San Mauro (San Mauro Castelverde), Pollina, Caronia (from 1412), Cefalù, Sciacca, Termini Imerese; Count of Montesarchio, Bitonto, Casamassima, Serracapriola, Castellamare di Stabia, Orta Nova and Magliano; and finally Baron of Ciminna. Under the Aragonese, Giovanni I served as Grande Ammiraglio del Regno (Grand Admiral of Sicily Kingdom); Viceré di Sicilia (Viceroy of Sicily) from 1430–1432; Governor of Naples Kingdom in 1435; Viceroy of Duchy Athens and Neopatria in 1444; Regent of Naples Kingdom in 1460; and Captain General of the Church in 1445 and 1455. He married a noblewoman from the Moncada family of Spain. 

Giovanni married twice:
(1) Agata d'Aragona dei Baroni di Caccamo,
(2) Isabella Ventimiglia dei Signori di Ciminna.

In 1475, Giovanni I's son by Isabella, Antonio I inherited the title of the 2nd Marquis of Geraci. He served as Grand Admiral and General Captain of Sicily and died in 1480. In 1444, Antonio had married Margherita Guilhem de Clermont-Lodève, sister-in-law of Ferdinand I of Naples and one of the daughters of Tristan de Clermont, the powerful and influential Count of Copertino and Matera. From 1480 to 1490 the 3rd Marquis of Geraci was both a "Ventimiglia - Chiaromonte", namely, Enrico IV. In 1480, he married Eleonora de Luna, born to an influential Spanish family with links to the Aragoese crown. Antonio died in 1493. His son by Eleonora Filippo born after 1480, died however in 1497 before reaching adulthood. The title passed on to Filippo's brother Simone (1485-1544). Simone Ventimiglia served as president of Sicily Kingdom (1516, 1535, 1541) and Treasurer and Comptroller General of Sicily Kingdom (1522-1534). Simone I married Isabella Moncada, from the Counts of Aderno, and the eldest surviving male son was Giovanni II Ventimiglia, who had his succession as Marquis confirmed under Charles V, Holy Roman Emperor.

The (Ventimiglia - La Grua - Moncada) families
Hugo of Moncada y de Tolça, (1476 - Naval battle at the Gulf of Salerno, Italy, 28 May 1528), Viceroy of Sicily, 1509–1517, Viceroy of Naples, 1527–1528,  was a young brother of Juan de Moncada y de Tolça, 1st count of Aitona.

 .

The title of Count of Aitona was modified to Marquisate by king Philip II of Spain on 1 October 1581 on behalf of Francisco de Moncada y de Cardona, Count of Ossona, Viscount of Cabrera, Viscount of Bas, Viceroy of Catalonia, 1580–1581, deceased 1594.

Giovanni II Ventimiglia, son in law of Juan de Moncada y de Tolça, 1st count of Aitona, in 1532, deceased after 1536, brother in law of Francisco de Moncada y de Cardona, deceased 1594, was a keen supporter of the mathematical sciences, besides being twice also Viceroy of Sicily, 1595–1598 and 1606–1607. He supported the efforts of scientist Francesco Maurolico, (1494–1575), see above.

References
https://sites.google.com/a/centrostudiventimigliani.com/www-centrostudiventimigliani-com/
http://www.grandesp.org.uk/historia/gzas/aitona.htm
GIOVANNI EVANGELISTA DI BLASI E GAMBACORTA - "Storia cronologica dei Viceré, Luogotenenti e Presidenti del Reyno de Sicilia", 4 vols. (1790), facsimile edited by the Government of Sicily, 1974.
Storia cronologica dei vicerè, luogotenenti, e presidenti del regno di Sicilia. Seguita da un'appendice sino al 1842 [by P. Insenga]. by Giovanni Evangelista di Blasi e Gambacorta, Pompeo Insenga, (1842), 876 pages, Palermo, dalle Staperia Oretea. Available at the Monaco Royal Library, but fortunately, made available through Google 12 million books, by now, Program on Uncopyrighted and Old Books: https://books.google.com/books?id=_t4ahpdB9BgC&pg=RA1-PA864
http://www.bestofsicily.com/index.htm
http://www.bestofsicily.com/history2.htm
http://www.bestofsicily.com/history3.htm
http://www.bestofsicily.com/roadmap.htm
Compendio dela Storia di Sicilia by Niccolo Maggiore, (1840), bought by Harvard College Library 1912, available through Google Uncopyrighted and Old Books program: https://books.google.com/books?id=I_8KAAAAYAAJ&pg=PA255

Marquesses of Spain
16th-century Italian nobility
1553 deaths
Year of birth unknown
House of Ventimiglia